The 2019 World Ringette Championships (2019 WRC) was an international ringette tournament and the 13th (XIII) World Ringette Championships. The tournament was organized by the International Ringette Federation (IRF) and was contested in Burnaby, British Columbia, Canada, from November 25 - December 1, 2019. The main competition took place at the Bill Copeland Sports Centre.

The games were recorded and live streamed by Sports Canada TV and have since been made available for public viewing on the video sharing site, YouTube, by Ringette Canada. Fifteen of the games were live-streamed online and made available for public viewing.

Overview
Participating national teams in the included: Team Canada Senior, Team Canada Junior (U19), Team Finland Senior, Team Finland Junior (U19), Team Sweden Senior, Team USA Senior, and Team Czech Republic.

Team Finland Senior won the gold medal in the Senior Pool,  the "Sam Jacks Series", and Team Canada Junior won the gold medal in the Junior Pool. In the President's Pool, Sweden claimed gold, the USA claimed silver, and the Czech Republic claimed the bronze.

Venue

Teams

Final standings

Senior Pool results 

The Senior Pool competition, also known as the "Sam Jacks Series", was a three-game series between Team Canada Senior and Team Finland Senior. Team Finland Senior won the gold medal and the Sam Jacks Trophy.

Junior Pool results 
The Junior Pool competition was a three-game series between Team Canada Junior and Team Finland Junior.
The winning team, Team Canada Junior, won the gold medal, the world junior title, and was rewarded with the new Juuso Wahlsten Trophy, the first year the trophy was introduced to the tournament.

President's Pool results 
The President's Pool involved junior (U19) athletes from Team Canada Junior and Team Finland Junior competing with the developing ringette countries. Team Sweden Senior won and was rewarded with a gold medal and the President's Trophy.

Rosters

Seniors

Team Finland Senior
The 2019 Team Finland Senior team included the following:

Team Canada Senior
The 2019 Team Canada Senior team competed in the 2019 World Ringette Championships. The 2019 Team Canada Senior team included the following:

Juniors

Team Finland Junior
The 2019 Team Finland Junior team included the following:

Team Canada Junior
The 2019 Team Canada Junior team included the following:

On March 18, 2021, Ringette Canada announced that it had inducted the 2019 Junior National Team into the Ringette Canada Hall of Fame.

President's Pool

Team Sweden Senior
The 2019 Sweden Senior team included the following:

Team USA Senior
The 2019 USA Senior team included the following:

Team Czech Republic Senior
The 2019 Czech Republic Senior team included the following:

See also
 World Ringette Championships
 International Ringette Federation
  Canada national ringette team
  Finland national ringette team
  Sweden national ringette team
  United States national ringette team
  Czech Republic national ringette team

References

Ringette
Ringette competitions
World Ringette Championships
World Ringette Championships
World Ringette Championships
International sports competitions hosted by Canada
2010s in British Columbia
World Ringette Championships
World Ringette Championships
Sport in British Columbia